Xenolimosina is a genus of flies belonging to the family of the Lesser Dung flies.

Species
X. glabrigena Marshall, 1999
X. palaeospinosa Marshall in Marshall, Langstaff & Grimaldi, 1999
X. phoba Marshall, 1985
X. setaria (Villeneuve, 1918)
X. sicula Marshall, 1985

References

Sphaeroceridae
Diptera of North America
Diptera of South America
Muscomorph flies of Europe
Neogene Dominican Republic
Sphaeroceroidea genera